The 1971 New York Yankees season was the 69th season for the franchise. The team finished fourth in the American League East with a record of 82–80, 21 games behind the Baltimore Orioles. New York was managed by Ralph Houk. The Yankees played their home games at Yankee Stadium.

Offseason 
 March 31, 1971: Pete Ward was released by the Yankees.

Regular season

Season standings

Record vs. opponents

Notable transactions 
 April 9, 1971: Ron Klimkowski and Rob Gardner was traded by the Yankees to the Oakland Athletics for Felipe Alou.
 May 26, 1971: Curt Blefary was traded by the Yankees to the Oakland Athletics for Rob Gardner.
 May 28, 1971: Bill Burbach was traded by the Yankees to the Baltimore Orioles for Jim Hardin.
 June 7, 1971: Frank Tepedino and Bobby Mitchell were traded by the Yankees to the Milwaukee Brewers for Danny Walton.
 June 8, 1971: 1971 Major League Baseball Draft
Larry Murray was drafted by the Yankees in the 5th round.
Mike Pazik was drafted by the Yankees in the 1st round (13th pick) of the Secondary Phase.
 June 25, 1971: Ron Woods was traded by the Yankees to the Montreal Expos for Ron Swoboda.
 July 17, 1971: Bobby Cox was signed as a free agent by the Yankees.
 August 28, 1971: Bobby Cox was released by the Yankees.

Roster

Player stats

Batting

Starters by position 
Note: Pos = Position; G = Games played; AB = At bats; H = Hits; Avg. = Batting average; HR = Home runs; RBI = Runs batted in

Other batters 
Note: G = Games played; AB = At bats; H = Hits; Avg. = Batting average; HR = Home runs; RBI = Runs batted in

Pitching

Starting pitchers 
Note: G = Games pitched; IP = Innings pitched; W = Wins; L = Losses; ERA = Earned run average; SO = Strikeouts

Other pitchers 
Note: G = Games pitched; IP = Innings pitched; W = Wins; L = Losses; ERA = Earned run average; SO = Strikeouts

Relief pitchers 
Note: G = Games pitched; W = Wins; L = Losses; SV = Saves; ERA = Earned run average; SO = Strikeouts

Awards and honors
Outfielder Bobby Murcer competed in his first All-Star Game

Farm system 

LEAGUE CHAMPIONS: Oneonta

Notes

References 
1971 New York Yankees at Baseball Reference
1971 New York Yankees team page at www.baseball-almanac.com

New York Yankees seasons
New York Yankees
New York Yankees
1970s in the Bronx